The Class 98.11 steam locomotives of the Deutsche Reichsbahn were rebuilds of the Bavarian Class GtL 4/4 (DRG Class 98.8-9). 

Because the riding qualities of the Class 98.10 were still not good enough to raise the speed of branch line (Lokalbahn) trains in Bavaria significantly, the Reichsbahn decided in 1934 to rebuild a Class GtL 4/4 engine (no. 98 906). Amongst other things, it was given an additional leading axle. As a result, the boiler and driver's cab had to be moved forward, which resulted in their having to be raised by 250 mm. 

After trials with the locomotive had proved successful, it was decided to modify another 26 engines by 1939 and to allocate them to a new locomotive class. A further engine followed in each of the years 1940 and 1941. The rebuilds were given numbers 98 1101 - 98 1129.

The permitted top speed of the rebuilds could be raised to 55 km/h, compared with 40 km/h for the GtL 4/4 and 45 km/h for the Class 98.10.

All 29 locomotives survived the Second World War. Apart from 98 1108, which went to the DR in East Germany, they all went into the Deutsche Bundesbahn. The East German engine was retired in 1967; those in the West between 1960 and 1968.

See also
 List of Bavarian locomotives and railbuses
 List of DRG locomotives and railbuses

References

98.11
2-8-0T locomotives
98.11
Railway locomotives introduced in 1934
Locomotives of Bavaria
Standard gauge locomotives of Germany
1′D h2t locomotives
Rebuilt locomotives
Freight locomotives